The 22547/22548 Gwalior–Sabarmati Superfast Express is a Superfast train belonging to North Central Railway zone of Indian Railways that run between  and  in India.

It is currently being operated with 22547/22548 train numbers on tri-weekly basis.

Coach composition

The train has standard LHB rakes with max speed of 110 kmph. The train consists of 21 coaches:
 
 1 AC II Tier
 3 AC III Tier
 9 Sleeper coaches
 6 General Unreserved
 2 End-on Generator

Service

The 22547/Gwalior–Ahmedabad Superfast Express has an average speed of 56 km/hr and covers 983 km in 17 hrs 35 mins.
The 22548/Ahmedabad–Gwalior Superfast Express has an average speed of 57 km/hr and covers 983 km in 17 hrs 20 mins.

As the average speed of the train is above 55 km/hr, as per Indian Railways rules, its fare includes a Superfast surcharge.

Route and halts

The important halts of the train are:

Schedule

Rake sharing

The train shares its rake with 12547/12548 Agra Cantt–Ahmedabad Superfast Express.

Traction

As this route is going to be electrified the WDP-4 or WDP-4D pulls the train to the destination on both directions.

References

Express trains in India
Transport in Gwalior
Transport in Ahmedabad
Rail transport in Madhya Pradesh
Rail transport in Rajasthan
Rail transport in Gujarat
Railway services introduced in 2018